QV Andromedae (abbreviated to QV And, also known as HR 369 in the Bright Star Catalogue) is an Alpha2 Canum Venaticorum variable in the constellation Andromeda. Its maximum apparent visual magnitude is 6.6, so it can be seen by the naked eye under very favourable conditions. The brightness varies slightly following a periodic cycle of approximately 5.23 days.

The stellar classification of this star is B9IIIpSi, where the pSi suffix indicates that the star shows peculiar chemical composition with stronger than usual silicon lines.  This type of star is known as an Ap star, with the chemical peculiarities caused by strong magnetic fields and slow rotation leading to chemical stratification in the atmosphere.  The star is rotating at a projected rotational velocity of 49 km/s, with up to 0.05 magnitude variation of brightness during one rotation cycle. This leads to the classification of the star as an Alpha2 Canum Venaticorum variable.

The variability of QV Andromedae was first identified in 1975, and confirmed from Hipparcos photometry.  It was assigned the variable star designation QV Andromedae in the 73rd namelist of variable stars in 1997.

References

Andromeda (constellation)
007546
Alpha2 Canum Venaticorum variables
Andromedae, QV
0369
Durchmusterung objects
005939
Ap stars